Gromth is a Norwegian symphonic metal band formed in 2008 in Ski, Akershus.

History 
Gromth is the brainchild of Grimd, which small ideas came to his head back in the early nineties. He joined Khold in 2003 and played a lot of concerts during a quite busy period for the band. In mid 2000 he decided to write music for this long asleep project named Gromth in a more serious matter, and he contacted vocalist Ole and drummer Tjodalv to help him out with matters he couldn't fix himself. Ole quickly surprised everyone with his original grim throath, as a matter of fact he had never been in a band as a vocalist before. Tjodalv started Dimmu Borgir together with Silenoz and Shagrath back in the early nineties. In 1999 he left Dimmu Borgir and started Susperia with Cyrus. Beside Gromth he also perform the battery in Black Comedy. In Gromth a lot of material and recording was created during the years 2006–2008, but unfortunately a computer crash in Grimds homestudio deleted much material. After a small break he decided to start anew with new music equipment and totally new song material. In spring 2010 he decided to share the composing process with keyboarder Andre, and soon Gromth had enough material for the long-awaited first full-length album.

The band entered the Melodi Grand Prix competition in 2013 in the hope of representing Norway at the Eurovision Song Contest but their single, "Alone" failed to reach the top place. With the recording of this single they were joined by guitarist Kjell Karlsen as a permanent member and Emil Solli-Tangen as a guest singer. Grimd, who played both guitar and bass on the album switched to only bass.

Members

Discography

The Immortal (2011)

References

External links 

Norwegian symphonic metal musical groups